Polyanthos may refer to:

 Polyanthos (magazine), published in Boston by Joseph Tinker Buckingham
 A newspaper published in New York by George Washington Dixon

See also
 Polyanthus (disambiguation)